Sir Thomas de Hungerford (died 3 December 1397) of Farleigh Castle in Somerset, was the first person to be recorded in the rolls of the Parliament of England as holding the office of Speaker of the House of Commons of England, although that office had existed before his tenure.

Origins
Hungerford was the son of Walter de Hungerford of Heytesbury, Wiltshire, thrice a Member of Parliament for Wiltshire, in 1331/2, 1333/4 and 1336. His mother was Elizabeth FitzJohn, daughter and heiress of Sir Adam FitzJohn of Cherhill in Wiltshire. The Hungerford family had been  seated in Wiltshire since at least the twelfth century.

Uncle
Thomas's uncle was Robert Hungerford (d.1355), a Member of Parliament for Wiltshire in 1316 and a commissioner to inquire into the possessions of the Despensers after their attainder in 1328, and gave much land to the hospital at Calne in memory of his first wife, Joan, to the church of Hungerford, Berkshire, and to other religious foundations. He was buried in 1355 in Hungerford Church, where an elaborate monument long existed above his grave. An inscription to his memory is still extant in the church. His second wife was Geva, widow of Adam de Stokke, but he left no issue.

Career
Hungerford was Sheriff of Wiltshire from 1355 to 1360 and served several times as a Member of Parliament for Wiltshire: in April 1357, in 1360, 1362, January 1376/7, twice in  1380, in 1383, 1384, 1386, January 1389/90, and in January 1392/3. He served as a Member of Parliament for Somerset in 1378, 1382, 1388, and 1390. He was returned for both constituencies in 1384 and January 1389/90. He was knighted in February 1375. He was closely associated with John of Gaunt and acted for some time as steward of Gaunt's household.

Owing to Gaunt's influence, he was chosen in January 1376/7, in the last of Edward III's parliaments (the Bad Parliament), to act as Speaker of the House of Commons. According to the Rolls of Parliament (ii. 374) Hungerford "avait les paroles pur les communes d'Angleterre en cet parliament" ('[he] spoke for the commons of England in this Parliament'). He is thus the first person formally mentioned in the Rolls of Parliament as holding the office of speaker. Sir Peter de la Mare preceded him in the post, without the title, in the Good Parliament of 1376. In 1380 Hungerford was appointed Forester of Selwood. In 1369 he purchased from Walter Pavely, de jure Baron Burghersh, the manor of Farleigh Montfort, now called Farleigh Hungerford, which served as the chief residence of his descendants, and in 1383 obtained licence to crenellate his manor house there, which thus became Farleigh Castle. In about 1384 he aroused the suspicion of King Richard II, who attached him, but he obtained a pardon and also a confirmation of his free warren at Farleigh.

Marriages and children

He married twice:
Firstly to Eleanor Strug, daughter and heiress of Sir John Strug of Heytesbury;
Secondly to Joan Hussey (d. 1 March 1412), heiress of Sir Edmund Hussey of Holbrook, by whom he had one surviving son and heir, three other sons having predeceased him:
Walter Hungerford, 1st Baron Hungerford (d. 1449)

Death and burial
Hungerford died at Farleigh on 3 December 1397, and was buried in the Chapel of St Anne (north transept chapel) of St Leonard's Chapel, Farleigh Hungerford Castle, where his chest tomb with effigies of himself and his wife survive. His portrait was made in a stained-glass window, engraved in Hoare's Modern History of Wiltshire, Heytesbury Hundred, p. 90.

Sources
Lee Sidney. Dictionary of National Biography, Volume 28, pp. 257,258
Dugdale's Baronage;
Collinson's Somerset, iii.353;
Manning's Lives of the Speakers;
Returns of members of parliament;
Hoare's Hungerfordiana, privately printed, 1823;
Canon Jackson's Guide to Farleigh-Hungerford, 1853.
Attribution
History of Parliament HUNGERFORD, Sir Thomas (d.1397), of  Farleigh Hungerford, Somerset and Heytesbury, Wilts

References

1330 births
1397 deaths
People from Backwell
Speakers of the House of Commons of England
High Sheriffs of Wiltshire
Thomas
English MPs 1357
English MPs 1360
English MPs 1362
English MPs January 1377
English MPs 1378
English MPs 1379
English MPs January 1380
English MPs November 1380
English MPs May 1382
English MPs October 1383
English MPs April 1384
English MPs September 1388
English MPs January 1390
English MPs November 1390
English MPs 1393
English MPs 1386